Leiarius arekaima, commonly as Tiger Pimelodus, is a species of benthopelagic catfish of the family Pimelodidae that is native to Guyana and Brazil.

Description
It grows to a length of 66.0 cm.

References

Pimelodidae
Catfish of South America
Fish described in 1841